is a Japanese footballer who plays for Giravanz Kitakyushu.

Club statistics
Updated to 23 February 2018.

References

External links

Profile at Tochigi SC
Profile at Renofa Yamaguchi
Profile at Giravanz Kitakyushu

1991 births
Living people
Kyoto Sangyo University alumni
Association football people from Hyōgo Prefecture
Japanese footballers
J2 League players
J3 League players
Gainare Tottori players
Renofa Yamaguchi FC players
Tochigi SC players
Giravanz Kitakyushu players
Association football midfielders